Willem "Wim" van Hanegem (born 20 February 1944) is a Dutch former football player and coach who played as a midfielder. In a playing career spanning over 20 years, he won several domestic honours in the Netherlands, as well as a European Cup and a UEFA trophy, all with Feyenoord. He was also a finalist in the 1974 FIFA World Cup. As a manager, he won the league and cup with Feyenoord and spent a period as the Dutch national team's assistant coach. His most recent job as manager was for FC Utrecht, from 2007 to 2008.

Playing career 
Born in Breskens, Van Hanegem played for Velox SC, Xerxes/DHC, Feyenoord, AZ'67, Chicago Sting, FC Utrecht and, finally, Feyenoord once again.

Style of play 
In the Netherlands he is widely considered one of the best Dutch football players in history. He was renowned for his tactical insight and was well known for his fantastic passing range and his ability with the ball at his feet. Both his way of sprinting (he had bandy legs), and his skill to give the ball a curve (achieved by striking the ball with the outside of his left foot) gave him the nickname De Kromme (The Crooked). Whilst being primarily renowned for the technical part of his game, he was also highly capable in the defensive part of his game, being a good tackler and not afraid to go into physical challenges. His primary weakness was his lack of pace.

Coaching career 
After retiring as a player, Van Hanegem joined Feyenoord as assistant manager in 1983 and stayed in the post until 1986. He then joined FC Utrecht as assistant, before moving to FC Wageningen. He returned to Feyenoord as manager in 1992, winning the league in 1993 and the Dutch Cup in 1994 and 1995.

In 1995, he had a spell as manager with Saudi Arabian club Al-Hilal, then took the post at AZ'67 in 1997. He joined Sparta Rotterdam in 2001. His stay was short-lived, and afterwards he became assistant manager of the Dutch national side. He was appointed manager of FC Utrecht in July 2007 and was fired on 23 December 2008.

Personal life 
Van Hanegem was known for rough, passionate play against German sides (before the 1974 final, he exhorted the Dutch side to "stuff the Germans"). "I don't like Germans. Everytime I played against German players, I had a problem because of the war."

In the summer of 1944 the German 15th army was fleeing northward from Calais to the Netherlands. On 11 September the Allies bombed the Wehrmacht near the ferry terminal at Breskens. Citizens had fled the town but Lo and Izaak van Hanegem, Willem's father and older brother, went back to get supplies. They hid in a shelter, which was hit. Both died. Van Hanegem later lost a brother and a sister to the war. His hatred was summed up after the 1974 final, "I didn't give a damn as long as we humiliated them. They murdered my father, sister and two brothers. I am full of angst. I hate them." After the game (with Germany winning 2–1) Van Hanegem left the field in tears.

In later years, however, Van Hanegem used a more conciliatory tone, when commenting on the war.

Willem's son, Willem van Hanegem Jr., is an international electronic dance music artist and DJ. Together with Ward van der Harst, he forms the DJ/producer duo W&W.

Honours

Player 
Feyenoord
 Eredivisie: 1968–69, 1970–71, 1973–74
 KNVB Cup: 1968–69
 European Cup: 1969–70
 Intercontinental Cup: 1970
 UEFA Cup: 1973–74

AZ'67
 KNVB Cup: 1977–78

Netherlands
 FIFA World Cup: runner-up 1974
 European Football Championship: third place 1976

Individual
 Dutch Footballer of the Year: 1971

Manager 
Feyenoord
 Eredivisie: 1992–93
 KNVB Cup: 1993–94, 1994–95

References

External links 

 Statistics
 

1944 births
Living people
People from Breskens
Footballers from Hendrik-Ido-Ambacht
Dutch footballers
Association football midfielders
Dutch association football commentators
Netherlands international footballers
Eredivisie players
Velox SC players
XerxesDZB players
Feyenoord players
AZ Alkmaar players
Van Hanegem, Willem
FC Utrecht players
1974 FIFA World Cup players
UEFA Euro 1976 players
Van Hanegem, Willem
Dutch expatriate footballers
Expatriate soccer players in the United States
Dutch expatriate sportspeople in the United States
Dutch football managers
Eredivisie managers
FC Wageningen managers
Feyenoord managers
Van Hanegem, Willem
AZ Alkmaar managers
Sparta Rotterdam managers
FC Utrecht managers
UEFA Champions League winning players
UEFA Cup winning players
Footballers from Zeeland